Evergreen Cemetery, in Bloomington, Illinois, is also known as Evergreen Memorial Cemetery.

The cemetery was originally two separate cemeteries, adjacent to each other. The first was the Bloomington Cemetery, founded in 1850 by the Bloomington Cemetery Association; the other was Evergreen Cemetery, founded in 1860.  The Bloomington Cemetery was funded by city tax dollars, while Evergreen was privately funded and maintained.  The website of the current cemetery claims Evergreen was founded in the early 1820s.

Over the years, Evergreen suffered from vandalism and deterioration.  Community action in the 1950s and 1960s forced the city of Bloomington to buy out the owners of Evergreen Cemetery in 1963, creating the merged Evergreen Memorial Cemetery.

The grounds of Evergreen Memorial Cemetery, which are maintained by staff and community members, include a Civil War burial section.

The McLean County Museum offers tours of the cemetery the last Saturday & Sunday of September and the first Saturday & Sunday of October. The Evergreen Cemetery Discovery Walk combines historical research by Museum volunteers, costumed actors from Illinois Voices Theatre, and Evergreen Memorial Cemetery into a week-long outdoor theatrical production.  People who contributed to central Illinois’ colorful history are brought to life through costumed actors assuming the intriguing characters of McLean County’s ancestors.  Presented is not only the "who's who" of McLean County but also the regular day-to-day voices from the past, people who have contributed to the growth, diversity and success of McLean County in unique and innovative ways.

Notable persons interred 
 David Davis – Associate Justice of the Supreme Court of the United States and United States Senator
 Ulysses F. Doubleday – U. S. Representative
 Jesse Fell – founder of Illinois State University
 Louis Fitzhenry – U. S. Representative
 Benjamin F. Funk – U. S. Representative
 Isaac Funk – Illinois State Senator
 Dorothy Louise Gage – niece of L. Frank Baum's wife, Maud Gage Baum, and basis for Dorothy Gale in his book The Wonderful Wizard of Oz
 Asahel Gridley – Illinois State Senator
 John McNulta – U. S. Representative
 William W. Orme – Civil War General
 Charles "Old Hoss" Radbourn – Major League Baseball player, member of the National Baseball Hall of Fame
 James Harvey Robinson (1863–1936) – Historian, scholar, educator
 John M. Scott – Chief Justice of the Supreme Court of Illinois
 Julia Green Scott – President of the Daughters of the American Revolution
 Giles Alexander Smith – Civil War General
 Adlai Stevenson I – Vice President of the United States
 Adlai Stevenson II – United States Ambassador to the United Nations, Governor of Illinois, Presidential Candidate
 Thomas F. Tipton – U. S. Representative
 Carl Schurz Vrooman – Assistant Secretary of Agriculture under President Woodrow Wilson

References

External links
 

1850 establishments in Illinois
Cemeteries in Illinois
Bloomington, Illinois
Protected areas of McLean County, Illinois
Tourist attractions in Bloomington–Normal
Cemeteries established in the 1850s